Ceradenia is a genus of ferns in the family Polypodiaceae, subfamily Grammitidoideae, according to the Pteridophyte Phylogeny Group classification of 2016 (PPG I).

Species
, the Checklist of Ferns and Lycophytes of the World accepted the following species:

Ceradenia albidula (Baker) L.E.Bishop
Ceradenia alboglandulosa (Bonap.) Parris
Ceradenia argyrata (Bory ex Willd.) Parris
Ceradenia arthrothrix L.E.Bishop & A.R.Sm.
Ceradenia asthenophylla L.E.Bishop ex A.R.Sm.
Ceradenia aulaeifolia L.E.Bishop ex A.R.Sm.
Ceradenia auroseiomena L.E.Bishop
Ceradenia ayopayana M.Kessler & A.R.Sm.
Ceradenia bishopii (Stolze) A.R.Sm.
Ceradenia brunneoviridis (Baker ex Jenman) L.E.Bishop
Ceradenia capillaris (Desv.) L.E.Bishop
Ceradenia clavipila L.E.Bishop ex M.Kessler & A.R.Sm.
Ceradenia comorensis (Baker) Parris
Ceradenia comosa L.E.Bishop
Ceradenia congesta (Copel.) L.E.Bishop ex A.R.Sm.
Ceradenia curvata (Sw.) L.E.Bishop
Ceradenia deltodon (Baker) Parris
Ceradenia dendrodoxa L.E.Bishop
Ceradenia discolor (Hook.) L.E.Bishop
Ceradenia farinosa (Hook.) L.E.Bishop
Ceradenia fendleri (Copel.) L.E.Bishop
Ceradenia fragillima (Copel.) L.E.Bishop
Ceradenia fucoides (Christ) L.E.Bishop
Ceradenia gameriana (Vareschi) Mostacero
Ceradenia glabra M.Kessler & A.R.Sm.
Ceradenia glaziovii (Baker) Labiak
Ceradenia herrerae (Copel.) L.E.Bishop
Ceradenia intonsa L.E.Bishop ex León-Parra & Mostacero
Ceradenia intricata (C.V.Morton) L.E.Bishop ex A.R.Sm.
Ceradenia itatiaiensis Labiak & Condack
Ceradenia ivohibensis Rakotondr. & Parris
Ceradenia jimenezii M.Kessler & A.R.Sm.
Ceradenia jungermannioides (Klotzsch) L.E.Bishop
Ceradenia kalawayae M.Kessler & A.R.Sm.
Ceradenia kalbreyeri (Baker) L.E.Bishop
Ceradenia kegeliana (Kunze) comb. ined.
Ceradenia knightii (Copel.) L.E.Bishop
Ceradenia kookenamae (Jenman) L.E.Bishop
Ceradenia leucosora (Bojer ex Hook.) Parris
Ceradenia longipinnata (Copel.) L.E.Bishop
Ceradenia maackii Labiak & J.B.S.Pereira
Ceradenia madidiensis M.Kessler & A.R.Sm.
Ceradenia margaritata (A.R.Sm.) L.E.Bishop
Ceradenia marginalis León-Parra
Ceradenia marialta L.E.Bishop ex León-Parra
Ceradenia maxoniana L.E.Bishop
Ceradenia mayoris (Rosenst.) L.E.Bishop
Ceradenia melanopus (Hook. & Grev.) L.E.Bishop
Ceradenia meridensis (Klotzsch) L.E.Bishop
Ceradenia microcystis L.E.Bishop & A.R.Sm.
Ceradenia mirabilis L.E.Bishop
Ceradenia narinensis León-Parra
Ceradenia nubigena (Maxon) L.E.Bishop
Ceradenia nudicarpa (Copel.) L.E.Bishop
Ceradenia oidiophora (Mickel & Beitel) A.R.Sm.
Ceradenia pearcei (Baker) L.E.Bishop
Ceradenia phalacron (Stolze) A.R.Sm.
Ceradenia phloiocharis L.E.Bishop
Ceradenia pilipalaea M.Kessler & A.R.Sm.
Ceradenia pilipecten L.E.Bishop ex M.Kessler & A.R.Sm.
Ceradenia pilipes (Hook.) L.E.Bishop
Ceradenia podocarpa (Maxon) L.E.Bishop
Ceradenia praeclara L.E.Bishop
Ceradenia pruinosa (Maxon) L.E.Bishop
Ceradenia pseudodevoluta Rakotondr. & Parris
Ceradenia sacksii Sundue
Ceradenia sechellarum (Baker) Parris
Ceradenia semiadnata (Hook.) L.E.Bishop
Ceradenia setosa M.Kessler & A.R.Sm.
Ceradenia similis M.Kessler & A.R.Sm.
Ceradenia spectabilis Sundue
Ceradenia spixiana (M.Martens ex Mett.) L.E.Bishop
Ceradenia terrestris L.E.Bishop
Ceradenia tristis A.R.Sm.
Ceradenia tryonorum B.León & A.R.Sm.
Ceradenia tunquiniensis M.Kessler & A.R.Sm.
Ceradenia warmingii (C.Chr.) Labiak

References

Polypodiaceae
Fern genera
Taxonomy articles created by Polbot